Chandni Chowk Lok Sabha constituency is one of the seven Lok Sabha (parliamentary)  constituencies in the Indian National Capital Territory of Delhi. This constituency came into existence in 1956.

Assembly segments
Following the delimitation of the parliamentary constituencies, since 2008, it comprises the following Delhi Vidhan Sabha segments:

From 1993 to 2008, it comprised the following Delhi Vidhan Sabha segments:
 Pahar Ganj 
 Matia Mahal (Polling stations 1-83)
 Ballimaran
 Chandni Chowk 
 Minto Road (Polling station 136)
 Ram Nagar (Polling stations 104–112)
From 1966 to 1993, Chandni Chowk Lok Sabha constituency comprised the following Delhi Metropolitan Council segments:
 Civil Lines
 Chandni Chowk
 Ballimaran
 Ajmeri Gate
 Kucha Pati Ram
 Matia Mahal
 Pahar Ganj
 Qasabpura

Members of Parliament
The Chandni Chowk Lok Sabha constituency was created in 1957. The list of Member of Parliament (MP) is as follows:

Election results

17th Lok Sabha: 2019 General Elections

16th Lok Sabha: 2014 General Elections

15th Lok Sabha: 2009 General Elections

14th Lok Sabha: 2004 General Elections

13th Lok Sabha: 1999 General Elections

12th Lok Sabha: 1996 General Elections

See also
 Chandni Chowk
 Delhi City Lok Sabha constituency
 List of Constituencies of the Lok Sabha

References

External links
 Previous Lok Sabha Members by Constituency Lok Sabha website

Lok Sabha constituencies in Delhi
1956 establishments in Delhi
Constituencies established in 1956